Clifford Charles "Cliff" Burge (27 April 1892 – 14 August 1918) was an Australian rules footballer who played with Melbourne in the Victorian Football League.

He was killed in action in World War I in France.

Family
The son of Charles Abraham Burge (1863-1939), and Emily Jane Burge, née Morris (1861-1947).

He had two brothers, Trevor Robert William Burge (1895-1953), and Maxwell Lewis Burge (1899-1976), and two sisters, Emily Blanche Burge (1894-1895) and Emily May Burge (1897-1989).

Education
He completed his education at Melbourne High School, where he was a member of the school's First XVIII.

Football
He played five senior games for Melbourne in 1914. He was already in the army by the start of the 1915 season.

In May 1919, an unidentified former Melbourne footballer, wrote to the football correspondent of The Argus as follows:
"In 1914 the Melbourne football team, after its junction with the University, was a fine team, and succeeded in reaching the semi-finals.Out of this combination the following players enlisted and served at the front:—C. Lilley (seriously wounded), J. Hassett, H. Tomkins (severely wounded), J. Evans (seriously wounded), W. Hendrie, R. L. Park, J. Doubleday (died), A. Best, C. Burge (killed), C. (viz., A.) Williamson (killed), J. Brake, R. Lowell, E. Parsons (seriously wounded), A. M. Pearce (killed), F. Lugton (killed), A. George, C. Armstrong, P. Rodriguez (killed), J. Cannole (viz., Connole), A. Fraser (seriously wounded), T. Collins.These are all players of note, and in themselves would have formed a very fine side, but there is only one of them playing at the present time, viz., C. Lilley, who, as a matter of fact, takes the field under some disability owing to severe wounds which he received on service." — The Argus, 16 May 1919.

Military service
He enlisted in the First AIF on 19 February 1915. He was promoted to Second Lieutenant on 2 November 1917.

Death
Having fought at Gallipoli, and having survived a German gas attack in June 1918, he was killed in action on 14 August 1918, aged 23, during fighting at Villers-Bretonneux, France, just three months before the end of hostilities.

His (temporarily buried) remains were exhumed in 1920, and he was re-buried at the Villers–Bretonneux Military Cemetery.

See also
 List of Victorian Football League players who died in active service

Footnotes

References

 Hobbs, Greg (1984). 125 yrs of the Melbourne Demons: The Story of the Melbourne Football Club from 1858 to 1983, (Jolimont, Vic.), Melbourne Football Club.  
 Holmesby, Russell & Main, Jim (2007). The Encyclopedia of AFL Footballers. 7th ed. Melbourne: Bas Publishing.
 Main, J. & Allen, D., "Burge, Clifford", pp. 26–27 in Main, J. & Allen, D., Fallen – The Ultimate Heroes: Footballers Who Never Returned From War, Crown Content, (Melbourne), 2002. 
 World War One Embarkation Roll: Sergeant Clifford Charles Burge (28), collection of the Australian War Memorial.
 World War One Nominal Roll: Lieutenant Clifford Charles Burge, collection of the Australian War Memorial.
 Infantry: To be 2nd. Lieutenants ("Squadron Quartermaster-Sergeant Clifford Charles Burge, late 13th Light Horse Regiment"), Commonwealth of Australia Gazette, No.27, (Thursday, 28 February 1918), p.380.
 (Casualty List No.412) Roll of Honor: Victorian List: Wounded ("Lieut. C. C. Burge, Elsternwick (gas)"), The Weekly Times, (Saturday, 29 June 1918), p.32.
 The 429th Casualty List: Victorian Names: Killed in Action ("Lieut. C. C. Burge, Elsternwick"), The Mildura Cultivator, (Saturday, 14 December 1918), p.2.
 Australian Red Cross Society Wounded and Missing Enquiry Bureau files, 1914-18 War: 1DRL/0428: Lieutenant Clifford Charles Burge: 24th Battalion, Collection of the Australian War Memorial.
 World War One Service Record: Second Lieutenant Clifford Charles Burge (36), National Archives of Australia.
 Roll of Honour Circular: Lieutenant Clifford Charles Burge, collection of the Australian War Memorial.
 Roll of Honour: Lieutenant Clifford Charles Burge, Australian War Memorial.
 Lieutenant Clifford Charles Burge,  Commonwealth War Graves Commission.]

External links

 
DemonWiki profile

1892 births
1918 deaths
People educated at Melbourne High School
Australian rules footballers from Victoria (Australia)
Melbourne Football Club players
Australian military personnel killed in World War I
Australian Army officers
Military personnel from Victoria (Australia)